Asaro River is a river in Eastern Highlands province, Papua New Guinea, located at . The Asaro is a tributary of the Tua.

See also
Asaro Mudmen
Lower Asaro Rural LLG
Upper Asaro Rural LLG
Asaro River languages

References

Rivers of Papua New Guinea